Road signs in United Arab Emirates are modelled on the British road sign system that are regulated by the Road Traffic Authority (RTA) Dubai and Department of Transport (DoT) Abu Dhabi. The English language typeface is Transport and the Arabic language typeface is Naskh.

Route Classifications

There are three types of route signs in the UAE for classified roads.

Blue signs denote roads that facilitate travel between different Emirates. These are routes of National and International importance. Green signs denote roads that are wholly within the same Emirate. Brown signs provide for local wayfinding to places of local importance.

Gallery

Regulatory signs

Control signs

Mandatory signs

Prohibition signs

Parking control signs

Freeway control signs

Warning signs

Information signs

See also
 Roads and Transport Authority (Dubai)

References

Road transport in the United Arab Emirates
United Arab Emirates

uk:Дорожні знаки в Об'єднаних Арабських Еміратах